The Lost Art of Gratitude is the sixth book in The Sunday Philosophy Club Series by Alexander McCall Smith.

Plot
A second attempt by professors Lettuce and Dove to oust Isabel from her position at 'The Review of Applied Ethics' is thwarted and Isabel learns further lessons about gratitude and kindness.

2009 British novels
Novels by Alexander McCall Smith
Novels set in Edinburgh
Little, Brown and Company books